Patrick Develtere (born August 26, 1961 in Roeselare, Belgium) is Professor at the Faculty of Social Sciences of the University of Leuven (KU Leuven). From 2017 until the beginning of 2020 he was a principal adviser for European Social Policy at the European Political Strategy Centre (EPSC), the in-house think tank of the European Commission.

Biography 
Patrick Develtere got his PhD in Social Sciences in 1994 at the Katholieke Universiteit Leuven (KU Leuven) with his thesis Co-operation and Development. Develtere teaches international development co-operation at the Faculty of Social Sciences at the University of Leuven. From 2010 until 2017 he was the president of ACW, now Beweging.net. Beweging.net, also known as the Christian Workers' Movement. This institute is a partnership between the University of Leuven and Beweging.net.

From 1987 till 1990 he was an associate expert with the International Labour Organization (ILO). He worked for the ILO regional office in Port of Spain (Trinidad and Tobago) and to the liaison office of the ILO with the European Commission in Brussels.

Publications 
Develtere, P.; Huyse, H.; Van Ongevalle, J. (2021). International Development Cooperation Today: a radical shift towards a global paradigm. Leuven University Press. ISBN 9789462702615
A Whole-of-Society Approach for a new Africa-Europe Alliance - Develtere P., Capacity4dev, November 2019
Letter from Belgium - Develtere P., Great insights magazine, European Centre for Development Policy Management, Spring/Summer 2019
A Plea for Qualitative Growth: Qualityis better than more - Develtere P., De gids op maatschappelijk gebied, April 2016

Sources
 EPSC website

1961 births
Living people
Belgian social scientists
Belgian trade unionists
Flemish academics
Academic staff of KU Leuven
People from Roeselare